Bertam Valley is an agricultural-based village in Cameron Highlands, Malaysia, located close to Ringlet. The entry to the village is located at Ringlet. On one side of the village is a dam. A new road connects this village to Kuala Lipis.

References

Cameron Highlands
Villages in Pahang